Sidney Frederick Livingstone (born 29 March 1945) is an English stage, television, and film character actor. He has sometimes been credited as Sydney Livingstone.

Early life
Born in Rochdale, Lancashire, Livingstone was an apprentice chef, a salesman, and a plumber's merchant, before gaining a place at the Guildhall School of Music and Drama and training as an actor. He graduated in 1969.

Career
Livingstone's acting career began on stage, and by 1973 he was working with the Royal Shakespeare Company. He appeared in several productions directed by Trevor Nunn, including Richard II, Hamlet, Timon of Athens and The Blue Angel. An early film role came in The Ragman's Daughter (1972). In 1974 he played Mardian in the television film Antony and Cleopatra. His many other television credits include Jeeves and Wooster, Crown Court, Shine on Harvey Moon, Minder, and Boon. In 2016, he starred as Brian Reader in the British film Hatton Garden: the Heist.

Theatre
Coriolanus (Royal Shakespeare Company, Aldwych Theatre, 1973) as Officer
Hindle Wakes as Sir Timothy Farrar 
Inherit the Wind (The Old Vic, directed Trevor Nunn) as Bannister 
A Chorus of Disapproval (1985) as Jarvis
Richard II (Old Vic Theatre, directed Trevor Nunn) as Bishop of Carlisle
Hamlet (Old Vic Theatre, directed Trevor Nunn) as Voltimand
 Timon of Athens (Young Vic, directed Trevor Nunn) as Lucullus
Sitting Pretty as Max
Oklahoma! (Royal National Theatre) as Andrew Carnes
Arcadia (Royal National Theatre, 1993) as Richard Noakes  
Measure for Measure (Royal Shakespeare Company) as Provost
The Blue Angel (Royal Shakespeare Company, directed Trevor Nunn) as Bombler
Acorn Antiques: The Musical! (Theatre Royal Haymarket, 2005) as Ken 
Crazy for You (West End, 2011) as Everett Baker

Films
 The Ragman's Daughter (1972) as Borstal Instructor 
Antony and Cleopatra (1974) as Mardian
The Body in the Library (1984) as Brogan 
Lifeforce (1985) as Ned Price
 Passion Killers (1999) as FredOklahoma! (1999) as Andrew Carnes Hatton Garden: the Heist (2016) as Brian Reader

TelevisionCoronation Street (1976) as Roy Thornley<ref>"Gail Potter (Helen Worth) hogs a lunch date with Roy Thornley (Sidney Livingstone)", Belfast Telegraph, 26 July 1976, p. 6</ref>
Happy Since I Met You (television play, 1981) as Dennis
Miss Marple: The Body in the Library (1984) as Brogan 
The Crucifer of Blood (1991) as Roly Lamas Dir
Jeeves and Wooster: Trouble at Totleigh Towers and The Ties that Bind (1993) as Constable Oates 
Midsomer Murders: Days of Misrule (2008) as Don Mitchinson

Notes

External links
 

English male soap opera actors
English male film actors
English male musical theatre actors
English male television actors
Living people
People from Rochdale
1945 births